Jetset Records was a New York-based indie rock record label. Founded by Shelley Maple in 1996, the label's first release was a reissue of German punk rock band The Golden Lemons' fourth album, Punkrock.  The label has released music by a variety of independent bands, including Firewater, Sun Kil Moon and Mogwai.

Roster
16 Horsepower
Arab Strap
Black Box Recorder
Dean and Britta
Congo Norvell
David Candy
Death by Chocolate
Elysian Fields
Firewater
The Go-Betweens
Golden Lemons
The Gunga Din
The Jesus Lizard
Kid Silver
Luna
Macha
Mogwai
Prolapse
Sahara Hotnights
Erik Sanko
Seaworthy
Sister Sonny
Spoozys
The Stratford 4
Sun Kil Moon
Teenage Fanclub
Ten Benson
The Flaming Sideburns
Tram

References

American independent record labels
Defunct record labels of the United States